Boris Duyunov (Russian: Борис Иванович Дуюнов; born 2 January 1944) is a Soviet rower from Russia. He competed at the 1968 Summer Olympics in Mexico City with the men's coxed four where they came sixth. In the semi-final, he was temporarily replaced by Arkady Kudinov.

References

1944 births
Living people
Soviet male rowers
Olympic rowers of the Soviet Union
Rowers at the 1968 Summer Olympics
Sportspeople from Ufa